Martín Jaite was the defending champion but lost in the second round to Franco Davín.

Jay Berger won in the final 6–3, 6–3 against Franco Davín.

Seeds

  Martín Jaite (second round)
  Horacio de la Peña (second round)
  Horst Skoff (second round)
  Francisco Maciel (quarterfinals)
  Eduardo Bengoechea (first round)
  Christian Miniussi (first round)
  Carlos Kirmayr (first round)
  Mark Dickson (first round)

Draw

Finals

Top half

Bottom half

External links
 1986 Copa Banco Galicia Singles draw

Singles